Faten Zahran Mohammed (born October 11, 1955 in Cairo) is an Egyptian biochemist and environmental biologist, cancer biologist and toxicologist known for her work on the anti-tumoral effects of snake venom and iodoacetate. She is currently Professor of Biochemistry at Zagazig University, Egypt, head of the Biochemistry Division, Faculty of Science, and a member of Egyptian Universities Promotion Committees "EUPC".

Biography 
She worked as a Demonstrator of Biochemistry in Chemistry Department, Faculty of Science, Zagazig University, Egypt from 1977 to 1981. She served as Assistant Lecturer of Biochemistry, in the Faculty of Science, Zagazig University, Egypt from 1981 to 1985. Lecturer of Biochemistry, Chemistry Department, Faculty of Science, Zagazig University, Egypt from 1985 to  1991. She was Assistant Professor of Biochemistry, Chemistry  Department, Faculty of Science, Zagazig University, Egypt from 1991 to 1996. Professor of Biochemistry, Chemistry Department, Faculty of Science, Zagazig University, Egypt from 1996 until present (2008).
She received her B.Sc. in 1977, her M.Sc. in Biochemistry in 1981, and her Ph.D. in Biochemistry in 1985 from Faculty of Science, Ain Shams University.
She received her M.Sc. and Ph.D. under the supervision of Dr. Fawzia Abbas Fahim.

Selected publications
 Fahim FA., Zahran F., Mady EA. "Effect of N. nigricollis venom and its fraction on EAC in mice." In: INTERNATIONAL CONFERENCE OF THE EGYPTIAN SOCIETY OF TUMOR MARKERS ONCOLOGY, 1, Cairo, 1988. Abstracts...Cairo: Ain Shams University- Faculty of Medicine, 1988. 375-94.
 Mohamed AH, Fouad S, El-Aasar S, Salem AM, Abdel-Aal A, Hassan AA, Zahran F, Abbas N. "Effects of several snake venoms on serum and tissue transaminases, alkaline phosphatase and lactate dehydrogenase." Toxicon. 1981;19(5):605-9

References

 Personal Interviews, November and December 2008.

1955 births
Living people
Scientists from Cairo
Zagazig University alumni
Ain Shams University alumni
Academic staff of Zagazig University